Joyjatra is Bangladeshi film directed by Tauquir Ahmed and produced by Azam Faruk, featuring Mahfuz Ahmed, Bipasha Hayat, Azizul Hakim, Ahsan Habib Nasim, and others. The film is set in the period of the Bangladesh Liberation War.

Plot
Joyjatra takes place during the liberation war of Bangladesh. Many people from various villages and ethnic backgrounds attempt to flee to India after the Pakistan Army launched an attack on them. For days, the refugees have been stuck on a boat on a journey to India, but eventually, some of them were killed by the army.

Cast
 Mahfuz Ahmed as Baidhan
 Azizul Hakim as Adam
 Bipasha Hayat as Hawa
 Abul Hayat as Ramkrisna
 Humayun Faridi as Panchanand Saha
 Tariq Anam Khan as Tarafdar
 Chadni as Marium
 Intekhab Dinar as Johnson
 Rumana as Sokhina
 Shahed Sharif Khan as Kashem
 Shams Sumon as Jashimuddin
 Farhana Rahman as Jashimuddin's wife
 Shuvra as Fatema
 Ahsan Habib Nasim as Ali
 Nazma Anwar as Grandmother
 Saleh Ahmed as Imam
 Jayanta Chattopadhyay as Dr. Kalikingkor
 Mosharraf Karim (credited as Mosharraf Hossain) as Foni, who later converts to Islam and changes his name to Farid Ali.

Soundtrack
The songs of this film were composed by Sujey Shyam and the lyrics by Mosharraf Hossain.

Awards and nominations
This film won several awards including

Bangladesh National Film Awards

Dhaka International Film Festival
 Won Special Award for the Film

Meril Prothom Alo Awards
 Won Critics Choice Best Director - Tauquir Ahmed

See also
 Bangladesh National Film Awards
 Cinema of Bangladesh

References

External links

 Joyjatra on Bangla Movie Database

Bengali-language Bangladeshi films
Bangladeshi romantic drama films
2004 romantic drama films
Films based on the Bangladesh Liberation War
Films scored by Shujeo Shyam
Films directed by Tauquir Ahmed
2000s Bengali-language films
Best Film Bachsas Award winners
Best Film National Film Award (Bangladesh) winners
Films whose writer won the Best Screenplay National Film Award (Bangladesh)
Impress Telefilm films